Alexandra Moreno Roca (born 25 January 2000) is a Spanish professional racing cyclist, who last rode for UCI Women's Continental Team .

References

External links

2000 births
Living people
Spanish female cyclists
Place of birth missing (living people)